The Clemson Tigers are the athletic teams that represent Clemson University, located in Clemson, South Carolina. They compete as a member of the National Collegiate Athletic Association (NCAA) Division I level (Football Bowl Subdivision (FBS) sub-level for football), primarily competing in the Atlantic Coast Conference (ACC) for all sports since the 1953–54 season. Clemson competes for and has won multiple NCAA Division I national championships in various sports, including ACC football, men's soccer, and men's golf.

In 1896, football coach Walter Riggs came to Clemson, then Clemson Agricultural College of South Carolina, from Auburn University. He had always admired the Princeton Tigers, and hence gave Clemson the Tigers mascot. The Clemson Tigers field seventeen athletic teams. The South Carolina Gamecocks are Clemson's in-state athletic rival. The two institutions compete against each other in many sports, but the annual football game receives the most attention. Clemson's main rivals within the Atlantic Coast Conference are Georgia Tech and Florida State.

Tiger Paw logo
The Tiger Paw logo was introduced at a press conference on July 21, 1970. It was created by John Antonio and developed by Helen Weaver of Henderson Advertising in Greenville, South Carolina, from a mold of a Bengal tiger sent to the agency by the Field Museum of Natural History in Chicago. The telltale hook at the bottom of the paw is due to a scar that the tiger had and the hook at the bottom is also a sign that this is the official licensed trademark for the university.
And to be “properly displayed” it must be oriented as to look to be pointing to 1pm.

Teams

Clemson University sponsors teams in nine men's and nine and a half* women's NCAA sanctioned sports. Women's diving completed its final season in 2017, and Clemson announced on March 14, 2017, that it would add college softball, targeting a 2020 start for the program.

Football

Clemson has three national championships in football, the most recent coming in 2018 with a victory over Alabama 44-16 in the 2019 College Football Playoff National Championship. Clemson has appeared in the last six playoffs and won two national championships during those visits. The Tigers also possess the most Atlantic Coast Conference championships with 20, including winning the last six.

It has also won greater than 60% of its games, placing it in the top 25 on the all-time winning percentage list. Clemson also won two Southern Conference titles before joining the ACC. The 1981 squad, led by Head Coach Danny Ford, became the first athletic team in school history to win a national championship. Clemson defeated Nebraska 22–15 in the Orange Bowl in Miami, Florida, to win the 1981 NCAA Football National Championship. Stars of the game included Homer Jordan (QB) and Perry Tuttle (WR). Clemson finished the year 12–0 and ranked #1 in the Associated Press and Coaches polls.

Some of the most notable coaching names in Clemson football history are John Heisman (who also coached at Akron, Auburn, Georgia Tech, Penn, Washington & Jefferson, and Rice; the Heisman Trophy is named after him), Jess Neely, Frank Howard (whom the playing field at Death Valley is named after), and Danny Ford. After Tommy Bowden resigned midseason on October 13, 2008, Dabo Swinney took over as interim head coach. On December 1, 2008, Swinney was named head coach of the Clemson Tigers football team.

Before each home game, the team ends pre-game warm ups and proceeds to the locker room. With five minutes to go before game time, three buses leave the street behind the West Endzone carrying the Clemson football players. The buses pull to a stop at the gate in front of The Hill, and the Tigers gather at the top, where each player proceeds to rub "Howard's Rock," which is an imported rock from Death Valley, California that was presented to Frank Howard in 1967. While Tiger Rag is played and a cannon sounds, the Tigers run down the hill onto the field in front of over 83,000 screaming fans. This tradition has been dubbed "The most exciting 25 seconds in college football" by sportscaster Brent Musburger.

Basketball

The Clemson Men's Basketball team is coached by head coach Brad Brownell, announced April 13, 2010. Accomplishments include:

*vacated by NCAA 

The Clemson women's basketball team is currently coached by head coach Audra Smith.
Accomplishments include:

Baseball

, the Tiger baseball team has posted a combined 32 ACC regular season and tournament championships (the most in the conference), 43 NCAA Tournament appearances, 17 NCAA Regional Titles, 4 NCAA Super Regional Titles, and 12 College World Series appearances. Much of the baseball program's success occurred under Bill Wilhelm during his 35 seasons as Clemson's head coach. Monte Lee is the Tigers' current head coach, having replaced Jack Leggett after the conclusion of the 2015 season.

* - recognized ACC championships. ACC tournament has decided conference champion since 1973 (except for 1979 due to academic conflicts)

§ - the ACC recognizes Division Championships in baseball. Divisions serve the purpose of simplifying conference scheduling during the regular season. Winning percentages in regular season conference play are then used to determine seedings for the Conference Tournament.

Men's soccer

The men's soccer team was Clemson's second sports program to win a national championship, winning the NCAA Tournament in 1984 and again in 1987 and 2021. In their 26 appearances in the NCAA tournament, the men's soccer team garnered runner-up finishes in 1979 and 2015, and has appeared in the NCAA Final Four eight times, with the 2015 squad being the most recent team to accomplish that feat. In addition to their NCAA titles, the men's program has won 16 combined ACC regular season and tournament titles, with the last one coming in the 2014 ACC Tournament. The Tigers have known only four coaches in their history: Dr. I.M. Ibrahim (1967–1994, 388–100–31 career record), Trevor Adair (1995–2008, 50–48–10 record at Clemson), Phil Hindson (Interim coach in 2009, 6-12-1 record) and Mike Noonan. Famous former Tigers include Oguchi Onyewu, Stuart Holden and Paul Stalteri, all three whom are capped for their respective nations.

* - recognized ACC championships. ACC champion decided by tournament since 1987

Women's soccer

Women's soccer became a varsity sport at Clemson in 1994. The women's soccer team has won the ACC regular season crown twice, and advanced to the NCAA tournament sixteen times. The team has never been able to advance past the Quarterfinals of the NCAA tournament. However, the team has been able to reach the Quarterfinals four times. The Tigers have known five coaches in their history Tracey Leone (1994-1998 89-39-4 career record), Ray Leone (1999-2000 33-10-3 career record), Todd Bramble (2001-2007 80-51-17 career record), Hershey Strosberg (2008-2010 14-39-1 career record), and Eddie Radwanski (2011-Current).

Golf
The Tiger golf team have a tradition of being among the best in the ACC and the nation, having won several ACC titles and regularly qualifying for the NCAA Tournament. In 2003, Clemson defeated Oklahoma State to win its first National Championship in golf and the 4th overall for the school. In addition to that victory, Clemson also won the ACC and NCAA East Regional titles that year, making the Tigers the first program in NCAA history to win its conference, regional, and national championship tournaments in the same year. Clemson has also won seven regional titles since the NCAA adopted the regional tournament format in 1989. 2009 U.S. Open champion Lucas Glover played golf at Clemson.

Other varsity sports

In 2017, Logan Morris represented the US at the IAAF World Cross Country Championships in Uganda, finishing 45th out 101 runners in the Junior (under 20 ranks).

Jay Berger was a two-time All-America in tennis for Clemson, and went on to a pro career in which his highest world ranking was # 7.

* ACC Championship decided by tournament until 2004; regular season finish has determined the ACC champion since 2005 season.

* The Lady Tigers rowing team became the first team other than Virginia to win the ACC Championship since the ACC began sponsoring the women's rowing championship in 2000.

Discontinued varsity sports

*Clemson sponsored a women's diving team from 2013–2017.

Wrestling

Wrestling at Clemson University was discontinued in 1995, despite the success of the program, due to financial shortages from Tiger Athletics' funding from the university. The wrestling program began in 1975 winning the ACC title as a team under coach Eddie Griffin in 1991. The Tiger wrestling program produced 8 overall wrestlers with All-American status, two NCAA Champions, and a finish at the NCAA Championships as high as 7th in 1994. Sammie Henson is a former standout at Clemson, as one of the most accomplished tiger wrestlers with a 1993 and 1994 NCAA Champion titles who eventually earned a 2000 Olympic silver medal and became a 1998 world champion in freestyle wrestling.

Championships

Team championships
Clemson University has four team national championships awarded by the NCAA. Clemson has also won three Division I Football National Championships, in 1981, 2016, and 2018. These titles were awarded by polling services in 1981, and by the College Football Playoff system in 2016 and 2018.

Men's (7)
Golf (1): 2003
Soccer (3): 1984, 1987, 2021
Football (3): 1981, 2016, 2018
see also:
ACC NCAA team championships
List of NCAA schools with the most NCAA Division I championships

Notable non-varsity sports

Rugby

Clemson Rugby was founded in 1967. Although rugby is a club sport at Clemson, the team receives significant support from the university and from the Clemson Rugby Foundation, which was founded in 2007 by Clemson alumni. Clemson rugby has been led since 2010 by head coach Justin Hickey, who has also served as team manager for the U.S. national under-20 team.

Clemson's best season was 1996, when the team advanced to the national college rugby quarterfinals. Clemson also advanced to the round of 16 of the national playoffs for three consecutive years from 2005-2007. Clemson has played since 2011 in the Atlantic Coast Rugby League against its traditional ACC rivals. Clemson placed second in its conference in the spring 2012 season with a 6-1 conference record, narrowly missing out to Maryland for the conference title and a place in the national college rugby playoffs. Clemson again finished the spring 2013 season with a 6-1 conference record, and then defeated South Carolina 29-7 in the round of 16 national playoffs, before losing in the quarterfinals to Central Florida 20-24.

Olympic medalists
Baseball
Mike Milchin (1988, United States, pitcher, gold)
Kris Benson (1996, United States, pitcher, bronze)
Billy Koch (1996, United States, pitcher, bronze)
Matthew LeCroy (1996, United States, Catcher, bronze)

Swimming
Michelle Richardson (1984, United States, 800 free, silver)
Mitzi Kremer (1988, United States, 400 free relay, bronze)

Tennis
Gigi Fernández (1992 and 1996, United States, doubles, gold)

Track

Desai Williams (1984, Canada, 4x100 relay, bronze)
Tony Sharpe (1984, Canada, 4x100 relay, bronze)
Mark McKoy (1992, Canada, 110 hurdles, gold)
Kim Graham (1996, United States, 4x400 relay, gold)
Carlton Chambers (1996, Canada, 4x100 relay, gold)
Shawn Crawford (2004 and 2008, United States, 200m gold and 4x100 relay silver (2004), 200m silver (2008))
Michelle Burgher (2004, Jamaica, 4x400 relay, bronze)
Brianna Rollins (2016, United States, 100m hurdles, gold)
Kendra Harrison (2020, United States, 100m, silver) +
Patricia Mamona (2020, Portugal, Triple Jump, silver)

Wrestling
Noel Loban (1984, Great Britain, bronze)
Sammie Henson (2000, United States, silver)

+Harrison started her collegiate career at Clemson before transferring to Kentucky

Clemson–South Carolina rivalry

Other rivalries
Clemson's intra-conference football rivalries include Georgia Tech (GT leads 50-31-2), NC State (Clemson leads 58-28-1 in the Textile Bowl), Boston College (O'Rourke-McFadden Trophy, Clemson leads 17-9-2), and Florida State (FSU leads 20-12).

Clemson has a lesser rivalry with the University of Georgia, born because of the two institutions' close proximity (roughly 75 miles apart). Clemson and Georgia first met in 1897, only the second year the Tigers fielded a football team. The rivalry was at its height in the 1980s. The athletic departments recently added games to be played in 2021 in Charlotte, 2024 at Mercedes-Benz Stadium in Atlanta, 2029 in Clemson, and 2030 in Athens. Georgia leads the football series 43–18–4.

Facilities
The most prominent of Clemson's facilities is Memorial Stadium, Frank Howard Field, home to the Clemson University men's football team. Memorial Stadium is also known by its nickname, "Death Valley." Memorial Stadium is also home to the WestZone, which was completed in 2006. With the completion of the first phase of the WestZone, the listed capacity for Memorial Stadium is 81,500. The WestZone holds many IPTAY offices, Clemson football coach's offices, weight rooms, locker rooms, and a recruiting center.

The men's and women's basketball teams play at Littlejohn Coliseum, which has a listed capacity of 10,000 spectators. Littlejohn also acts as a venue for a variety of campus functions throughout the year, including concerts and graduation ceremonies.

Recently renovated Doug Kingsmore Stadium is home to Clemson's men's baseball team.

The men's and women's soccer teams play their home games at historic Riggs Field.

Other home venues for these sports are: Walker Golf Course, Hoke Sloan Tennis Center, Jervey Gym (volleyball), Rock Norman Track Complex, and McHugh Natatorium. Women's rowing holds home events on nearby Lake Hartwell.

References

External links